Robert Clifford Parsons (June 11, 1915 – March 1, 1985) was an American professional basketball player. He played for the Akron Goodyear Wingfoots in the National Basketball League during the 1938–39 and 1941–42 seasons and averaged 2.1 points per game.

References

1915 births
1985 deaths
Akron Goodyear Wingfoots players
All-American college men's basketball players
American men's basketball players
United States Navy personnel of World War II
Basketball players from Nebraska
Forwards (basketball)
Guards (basketball)
Nebraska Cornhuskers men's basketball players
Sportspeople from Lincoln, Nebraska
Sportspeople from Modesto, California